Mirsad Dedić (born 21 February 1968) is a Bosnian professional football coach and former goalkeeper who is the goalkeeping coach of Bosnian Premier League club Tuzla City.

International career
Dedić made his debut for Bosnia and Herzegovina in a November 1996 friendly match against Italy and has earned a total of 27 caps, scoring no goals. His final international was a January 2000 friendly against Qatar.

Honours

Player
Sarajevo
First League of Bosnia and Herzegovina: 1998–99
Bosnian Cup: 1996–97, 1997–98, 2001–02 
Bosnian Supercup: 1997

References

External links

1968 births
Living people
People from Srebrenik
Bosniaks of Bosnia and Herzegovina
Association football goalkeepers
Yugoslav footballers
Bosnia and Herzegovina footballers
Bosnia and Herzegovina international footballers
OFK Gradina players
FK Sarajevo players
Yverdon-Sport FC players
FK Budućnost Banovići players
FK Sloboda Tuzla players
Bosnia and Herzegovina expatriate footballers
Expatriate footballers in Switzerland
Bosnia and Herzegovina expatriate sportspeople in Switzerland
Association football goalkeeping coaches
Bosnia and Herzegovina expatriate sportspeople in Saudi Arabia